Severo-Zapadny may refer to:
Northwestern Federal District (Severo-Zapadny federalny okrug), a federal district of Russia
Northwestern economic region (Severo-Zapadny ekonomichesky rayon), an economic region of Russia
North-Western Administrative Okrug (Severo-Zapadny administrativny okrug), an administrative okrug of Moscow, Russia
Severo-Zapadny City District, a city district of Vladikavkaz, Republic of North Ossetia-Alania, Russia